The 61st district of the Texas House of Representatives contains the a portion of Collin county. The current Representative is Charles Anderson, who was first elected in 1998.

References 

61